Seth Kikuni (born 14 December 1981 in Kinshasa) is a Congolese entrepreneur, businessman, and politician who was one of the candidates in the 2018 Democratic Republic of the Congo presidential election. He was the youngest candidate.

References

External links
Official website

Living people
1981 births
People from Kinshasa
Democratic Republic of the Congo businesspeople
Democratic Republic of the Congo politicians
Candidates for President of the Democratic Republic of the Congo